Sten Dehlgren (26 May 1881 – 21 November 1947) was a Swedish Navy officer and newspaper editor.

He was born in Stockholm to Alfred Teodor Dehlgren and  Henrietta Sofia Malmgren. He was appointed editor-in-chief of the newspaper Dagens Nyheter from 1922. He served as chairman of the board of the news agency Tidningarnas Telegrambyrå for several years.

He died in Stockholm in 1947.

References

1881 births
1947 deaths
Journalists from Stockholm
Swedish newspaper editors
Swedish Navy officers
Dagens Nyheter editors